The Big Bad Wolf  is a 2013 French comedy film directed by Nicolas Charlet and Bruno Lavaine. A remake of the 2007 Canadian film The 3 L'il Pigs (Les 3 p'tits cochons), the film centres on three brothers living in Versailles who react to the terminal illness of their mother by having extramarital affairs.

Cast
 Benoît Poelvoorde as Philippe Delcroix
 Kad Merad as Louis Delcroix
 Fred Testot as Henri Delcroix
 Valérie Donzelli as Nathalie Delcroix
 Charlotte Le Bon as Natacha
 Zabou Breitman as Victoire Delcroix
 Cristiana Reali as Eléonore de Saint-André
 Léa Drucker as Patricia Delcroix
 Linh Dan Pham as Lai 
 Marie-Christine Barrault as Madame Delcroix
 Denis Podalydès as Doctor Stanislas de Lastic

References

External links
 

2013 films
2013 comedy films
French comedy films
Belgian comedy films
2010s French-language films
Films directed by Nicolas Charlet
Films directed by Bruno Lavaine
French-language Belgian films
2010s French films